The Defense Industries Organization (DIO) is a conglomerate of companies run by the Islamic Republic of Iran whose function is to provide the Armed Forces with the necessary manufacturing capacity and technical abilities. In recent years, the DIO has attempted to become export-oriented, allowing Iran to become an exporter of weapons.

History

Prior to 1963, the Iranian military industry consisted of a number of independent factories. Iran's military industry was born under the last Shah of Iran, Mohammad Reza Pahlavi. In 1973, the Iran Electronics Industries (IEI) was founded to organize efforts to assemble and repair foreign-delivered weapons. Most of Iran's weapons before the Islamic revolution were imported from the United States and Europe. Between 1971 and 1975, the Shah went on a buying spree, ordering $8 billion in weapons from the United States alone. This alarmed many in the U.S., which strengthened a 1968 law on arms exports in 1976 and renamed it the Arms Export Control Act. Still, the United States continued to sell large amounts of weapons to Iran until the 1979 Islamic Revolution.

In an early effort to overhaul Iran's military capabilities, Mohammad Reza Shah ordered the creation of the Military Industries Organization (MIO). Operating as a branch of the Ministry of War, the MIO was to oversee all military production within Iran. Over the next fifteen years, military plants produced small arms ammunition, batteries, tires, copper products, explosives, and mortar rounds and fuses. They also produced rifles and machine guns under license from West Germany. In addition, helicopters, jeeps, trucks, and trailers were assembled from imported kits in attempts to transfer technical knowledge to Iran. Additionally, the organization was charged with research and development and took the initiative in reverse engineering a number of Soviet RPG-7, BM-21, and SAM-7 missiles in 1979.

The Iranian Revolution halted all the military activities of the MIO. Plagued by the upheavals of the time, the MIO was left unable to operate without foreign specialists and technicians; by 1981 it had lost much of its management ability and control over its industrial facilities. 

The outbreak of the Iran–Iraq War in 1980 and the Western arms embargo served as a massive catalyst for the MIO to reorganize its operations. In late 1981, the new revolutionary government of Iran brought together the now disorganised sections of the MIO and placed them under the Defense Industries Organization. The DIO would from this point onwards supervise all production, research and development.

The Islamic Revolutionary Guard Corps was put in charge of re-organising the domestic military industry. Under their command Iran's military industry was dramatically expanded, and with the Ministry of Defence pouring capital into the missile industry, Iran soon had an arsenal of missiles.

Operations

In 1987, the DIO was governed by a mixed civilian-military board of directors and a managing director responsible for the actual management and planning activities. Although the DIO director was accountable to the deputy minister of defense for logistics, it was the president of Iran, in his capacity as the chairman of the SDC, had ultimate responsibility for all DIO operations.

Since 1992, it also has produced its own tanks, armored personnel carriers, missiles, a submarine, and a fighter plane.

Today, the DIO has more than 35,000 employees, 30% of whom are university graduates. It is also the key organisation driving Iran's significant military industry.

In 2007, following events in Iran's Nuclear Program, the United Nations Security Council placed sanctions against Iran forbidding it from exporting any form of weapons.

See also
 Iran Electronics Industries
 Iran Aviation Industries Organization

References

External links
 Official DIO Website
 GlobalSecurity.org - DIO
1981 establishments in Iran
Conglomerate companies of Iran
Manufacturing companies based in Tehran
Defence companies of Iran
Companies established in 1981
Ministry of Defence and Armed Forces Logistics of the Islamic Republic of Iran